Jacques van Rooyen (born 24 October 1986) is a South African rugby union player for the  in the United Rugby Championship and the  in the Currie Cup. His regular position is prop.

Career

Varsity Cup and amateur rugby
Van Rooyen was also in the South African police service for 2 years before getting a pro contract after varsity stating that he always wanted to follow in his father's footsteps as a police officer despite going to varsity

He also played for Irish side City of Armagh in the 2011–2012 Ulster Senior League.

Golden Lions

Bath

Van Rooyen moved to England to join Premiership side  prior to the 2018–19 season.

Honours
 Super Rugby runner up (3) 2016, 2017, 2018
 Currie Cup winner (2) 2020–21, 2021
 Pro14 Rainbow Cup runner-up 2021

References

South African rugby union players
Living people
1986 births
Rugby union players from Pretoria
Golden Lions players
Lions (United Rugby Championship) players
Rugby union props
Afrikaner people
Tshwane University of Technology alumni
Bath Rugby players
NTT DoCoMo Red Hurricanes Osaka players
Bulls (rugby union) players
Blue Bulls players